The Girard Academic Music Program (GAMP) is a public magnet secondary school in Philadelphia, Pennsylvania, and is part of the School District of Philadelphia, covering grades five through twelve.  All students are able to pursue music as a major subject area.

History 
The Girard Academic Music Program began operation in September 1974 as an alternative program within the Stephen Girard School at 18th and Snyder Avenue. It began with one 4th and one 5th grade class of approximately 55 students, 2 academic teachers, 1 teacher's aide and 1 music teacher/coordinator. They were the pioneers who initiated the academic and musical success of the school. Over its lifetime, the school has been based in several locations. From its inception until 1976, it was located in the Trinity Church Parish House at 18th & Wolf Streets). In 1976, it moved to the Armory, now owned by St. Rita's Church, located at Broad & Wharton Streets.

Since 1979, the school has been located in the former Edgar Allan Poe School at 22nd & Ritner Streets, in the Girard Estate neighborhood of Philadelphia, Pennsylvania. The building was designed by Henry deCoursey Richards and built in 1913–1914. It is a four-story, five bay, brick and limestone building on a raised basement in the Tudor Revival-style. It features a three-bay, projecting center section with an arched limestone entrance, decorative panels, and a parapet with battlement cuts.  It was named for author Edgar Allan Poe. The Poe school was added to the National Register of Historic Places in 1986.

As one of the first Small Learning Communities, GAMP has grown to its present size of a staff of 30 and over 600 students that include grades 5 through 12. The unique school organization has all students as “music majors” providing the framework for the development of a strong academic and musical program. With a 97–100% college acceptance rate among each senior class and scholarships valued at over one to two million dollars yearly, GAMP continues to grow in stature within the city of Philadelphia.

Music Studies

In addition to a rigorous, college-preparatory curriculum, students are required to enroll in several music courses every year, and may choose additional classes or ensembles to further develop their musicianship.

All students at GAMP participate in general choir, which is organized by grade groups: 5th and 6th grade, 7th and 8th grade, and 9th through 12th grade. The concert choir is an auditioned group which performs the most advanced repertoire and travels for various performances throughout the school year. The Concert Choir has performed for United States President Bill Clinton and Barack Obama, the Philadelphia Phillies, former Governor of Pennsylvania Ed Rendell, former Mayors of Philadelphia John Street and Michael Nutter, the inauguration for Mayor Jim Kenney, and alongside Grammy Award-winning singer Idina Menzel.

All students have three periods of Music Theory weekly. In theory class, students lean the basic building blocks of music, including sight singing, rhythm performance, dictation, written theory, composition, and functional piano skills. Advanced Placement Music Theory is offered for 11th and 12th grade students.

The Instrumental Music department consists of a variety of ensembles for both middle and high school students, including String Orchestra, Concert Band, Jazz Band, Marching Band. Students enrolled in instrumental music are provided weekly group lessons for their instrument. Ensembles have performed at a diverse number of locations and events, including the Philadelphia Museum of Art, Side by Side with the Philadelphia Orchestra, the Rittenhouse Square Flower Show, the Warwick Hotel, and the Marching Band in the annual Philadelphia Columbus Day Parade.

Sports
The school has cross country, baseball, tennis, basketball, softball, and cheerleading. Additionally, students may participate in other sports (football, volleyball, wrestling) through a partnership with South Philadelphia High School.

The GAMP mascot is the Pioneer. The mascot was named in a contest with Robert Fiss's selection of "Pioneers". "Quakers" was the second choice. The Pioneer was chosen because pioneers were courageous and contributed to the growth of this nation. GAMP is a pioneer in the field of education, by instilling in every student the art of music, making it a rarity in the School District of Philadelphia. Much like the Pioneers contributed to the growth of this nation by courageously settling unknown frontiers, GAMP contributes to the growth of young minds.

References

External links

 Girard Academic Music Program

School District of Philadelphia
Public middle schools in Pennsylvania
High schools in Philadelphia
Educational institutions established in 1974
Public high schools in Pennsylvania
Magnet schools in Pennsylvania
1974 establishments in Pennsylvania
South Philadelphia
School buildings on the National Register of Historic Places in Philadelphia
Tudor Revival architecture in Pennsylvania
School buildings completed in 1914